Gifu Prefectural Baseball Stadium is a multi-purpose stadium in Gifu, Japan.  It is currently used mostly for baseball matches.  The stadium was originally opened in 1930 and has a capacity of 30,000 spectators.

References

External links

Stadium picture

Baseball venues in Japan
Multi-purpose stadiums in Japan
Sports venues in Gifu Prefecture
Buildings and structures in Gifu
Sports venues completed in 1991
1991 establishments in Japan